The 1989 Lion Cup was the premier domestic rugby union knock-out competition in South Africa. This was the sixth edition of the Lion Cup.

Teams
All 26 South African provincial teams took part in this competition. They were ranked as follows:

Competition

This competition was a knock-out competition. The four teams ranked 23 to 26 played each other in the Qualifying Round with the two winners advancing to Round One, where they  joined the teams ranked 9 to 22. These sixteen teams played in eight matches, with the winners advancing to Round Two, where the top 8 ranked teams will join. In Round Two, the sixteen remaining teams would be reduced to eight and would be followed by the quarter finals, semi-finals and the Final.

Fixtures and results

The draw for Round One and Round Two were made on 25 February, The quarter final draw was made on 3 May and the semi-final draw on 28 May.

Qualifying round

Round one

Round two

Quarter-finals

Semi-finals

Final

See also
 1988 Currie Cup Division A
 1988 Currie Cup Division B
 1988 Santam Bank Trophy Division A
 1988 Santam Bank Trophy Division B

References

1988
1988 in South African rugby union
1988 rugby union tournaments for clubs